Robert Mathew TD (9 May 1911 – 8 December 1966) was a British Barrister and politician.

From a military family (his father was a major-general), Mathew went to Eton College and Trinity College, Cambridge. He read for the Bar and was called (Lincoln's Inn) in 1937. He joined the Territorial Army in the King's Royal Rifle Corps and during the Second World War served in Italy and Greece as well as at the Staff College. He ended the war with the rank of lieutenant-colonel.

He was demobilized early as a Parliamentary candidate, fighting South Ayrshire for the Conservative Party in the 1945 general election. He fought the same seat in a 1946 byelection, having in the meantime been elected to Chelsea Borough Council for Hans Town ward. He fought Rochester and Chatham in the elections of 1950 and 1951, a potentially winnable seat.

Mathew was chosen for the safe seat of Honiton and won it in the 1955 general election. Derek Walker-Smith, who served as Minister for Health, picked him as his Parliamentary Private Secretary from 1957 to 1960 and also in 1964. Although a backbencher, Mathew's views were regarded as important; his strong support for British membership of the European Economic Community when the Macmillan government applied for membership did much to solidify Conservative opinion.

Mathew died in his sleep in December 1966 at the early age of 55.

References
 M. Stenton and S. Lees, "Who's Who of British MPs" Vol. IV (Harvester Press, 1981)
 Obituary, "The Times", 9 December 1966.

External links 
 

1911 births
1966 deaths
People educated at Eton College
Alumni of Trinity College, Cambridge
King's Royal Rifle Corps officers
Conservative Party (UK) MPs for English constituencies
Members of Chelsea Metropolitan Borough Council
UK MPs 1955–1959
UK MPs 1959–1964
UK MPs 1964–1966
UK MPs 1966–1970
British Army personnel of World War II
Members of the Parliament of the United Kingdom for Honiton
Ministers in the Macmillan and Douglas-Home governments, 1957–1964